Neutrophil swarming is a type of coordinated neutrophil movement that acts in response to acute tissue inflammation or infection. The term comes from the swarming characteristics of insects that are similar to the behavior of neutrophils in response to an infection. These processes have mostly been studied in tissues of mice and studies of mouse ear tissue has proved to be very effective at observing neutrophil movement. Neutrophil swarming typically aggregates at surface layers of tissue so the thin nature of the mouse ear tissue makes for a good model to study this process. Additionally, zebrafish larvae have been used for the study of neutrophil movement mainly because of their translucence during the first few days of their development. With transgenic lines that fluorescently label zebrafish neutrophils, the cells can be tracked by epifluorescence or confocal microscopy during the course of an inflammatory response. Through this method, specific subpopulations of neutrophils can be tracked and their origin and fate during the induction and resolution of inflammation is observed. Another advantage for using zebrafish to study neutrophil swarming is that adaptive immunity for this organism does not develop until around 4 weeks of age. This allows for the study of neutrophil movement and other host immune responses independent of adaptive immune responses.

Variations 
A study of the lymph nodes of mice that were infected by injection of parasites into their earflaps revealed two types of neutrophil swarming: transient and persistent swarms. Transient swarms are characterized by groups of 10-150 neutrophils forming multiple small cell clusters within 10-40 minutes that quickly dispersed. Persistent swarms showed clusters of more than 300 neutrophils and recruitment lasted for more than 40 minutes. For both the transient and persistent swarms, the formed neutrophil clusters appeared to be competing with each other with the larger clusters attracting neutrophils from the smaller clusters. The study also revealed two distinct phases in swarm formation. The first phase occurs when a small number of “pioneer” neutrophils respond to an initial signal and form small clusters and this is followed by the second phase where there are a large scale migration of neutrophils leading to the growth of multiple cell clusters. 

The exact size or duration of swarms depends on the specific inflammatory conditions as well as the tissue type of the infection location. Several factors that influence the swarm phenotype are: the size of the initial tissue damage, the presence of pathogens, the induction of secondary cell death, and the number of recruited neutrophils. A study that compared large scale tissue damage of sterile mouse tissue by a needle prick with small injuries by a laser beam showed that the needle prick provoked a larger and longer swarm response. After the needle injury, hundreds to thousands of neutrophils were recruited that formed stable cell clusters that sometimes were prolonged for days. In comparison, the neutrophil swarms resulting from the laser induced injury only recruited around 50-330 neutrophils which persisted for a few hours. The presence of pathogens can also increase the size of neutrophil swarms, not necessarily because of their presence as a foreign body, but because of the additional cell death that they can cause in infection sites. When cells are lysed in an infection site, they release an assortment of signaling factors that augment the recruitment of neutrophils to the site. Additionally, neutrophil death during a swarm releases more signaling factors to recruit more neutrophils so the initial amount of neutrophils recruited plays a role in how large the propagation effect is during swarming.

Stages

Stages 1-3 
The neutrophil swarming process is categorized into 5 phases: swarm initiation, swarm amplification, additional swarm amplification through intercellular signaling, swarm aggregation and tissue remodeling, and recruitment of myeloid cells and swarm resolution. The first stage of neutrophil swarming details the “pioneer” neutrophils responding to an infection or inflammation site. The neutrophils close to the injury will switch from random motility to chemotactic movement within a period of 5-15 minutes and swarm towards the infection site. In the second stage, the pioneer neutrophils attract a second wave of neutrophils that come from more distant regions of the tissue. The methods of movement to the region of injury depends on the tissue environment the neutrophils are moving towards. Neutrophil swarming in extravascular spaces such as the connective tissue in the skin involves movement without the assistance of integrin proteins and neutrophil attraction by a gradient of chemoattractants. Neutrophils will be guided by the forces generated by the actomyosin cytoskeleton through the path of least resistance to the site of infection. However, for intravascular tissue environments, neutrophil movement is dependent on integrins and chemoattractant signals on the luminal surface of endothelial cells. In this process, distant neutrophils will be recruited by an inflammatory signal and perform integrin-mediated crawling along the vascular walls to reach the neutrophil swarming sites.

In the third stage, swarming neutrophils can amplify their recruitment in a feed forward manner through intercellular communication by leukotriene B4 (LTB4). The propagation of neutrophil recruitment leads to multiple, dense neutrophil cell clusters at the site of inflammation. A 2013 study showed that neutrophils lacking the high affinity receptor for LTB4 (LTB4R1) decreased the recruitment of neutrophils at later stages of swarming. In addition, proximal cells to the inflammation site showed chemotaxis similar to the control cells while distant cells were poorly attracted. This finding suggests that the proximal neutrophils that are recruited early on are not affected by the lack of LTB4R1, but distant neutrophils that are required for the propagation of neutrophil swarming are not able to be recruited to the swarming site. These results present LTB4 as a key signaling molecule for a prolonged neutrophil swarm response and recruitment of neutrophils from distant areas of the tissue.

Stages 4-5 
After stages 1-3, neutrophils slow down in the cell clusters and begin to form aggregates. In this fourth stage, the neutrophil aggregates will aid in rearranging the surrounding extracellular tissue area and create a collagen-free zone at the inflammation center eventually resulting in a wound seal which isolates the site from the rest of the tissue. The exact mechanisms of this are unknown but it is believed that neutrophil proteases from the cell clusters play a role in clearing out the surrounding tissue environment. These neutrophil aggregates become stable as opposed to the constant movement in stages 1-3 by development of high chemoattractant concentrations within the clusters that promote local neutrophil interactions within the cluster. Additionally, neutrophils are switched to an adhesive mode of migration within clusters which further stabilize the aggregates and can prevent neutrophils from leaving the cluster. This switch is believed to be caused by additional secretions of LTB4 and other chemoattractants within the neutrophil aggregates. 

In stage 5, the swarming response terminates and the clusters dissolve with the resolution of inflammation. Little is known about the mechanisms of this stage but the process may be regulated by neutrophils or external factors from the tissue environment. In a laser-induced skin injury model, neutrophil aggregation typically stopped after 40-60 minutes which occurs at the same time as the appearance of secondary myeloid cell swarms. Knock-in mice studies have shown that the myeloid cells move slower than neutrophils and assemble around the neutrophil aggregates during this stage. These myeloid cells may disrupt the propagation signals of neutrophil chemoattractants or to create competing attractants in the tissue space so that the neutrophil aggregation is less strong.

References 

Cell biology